Anwar Mesbah (April 8, 1913 – November 25, 1998), along with Khedr Eltouny, competed as a weightlifter at the 1936 Summer Olympics, held in Berlin. Mesbah won a gold medal for Egypt, sharing the gold medal with Robert Fein with whom he tied, by lifting a record 342.5 kg.

Born in Alexandria, he was considered a great athlete of his time.

References

Weightlifters at the 1936 Summer Olympics
Olympic weightlifters of Egypt
Egyptian male weightlifters
1913 births
1998 deaths
Sportspeople from Alexandria
Olympic medalists in weightlifting
Medalists at the 1936 Summer Olympics
Olympic gold medalists for Egypt
20th-century Egyptian people